The 2005 Belgian Cup Final, took place on 28 May 2005 between Club Brugge and Germinal Beerschot. It was the 50th Belgian Cup final and was won by Germinal Beerschot.

Route to the final

Match

Details

External links
  

Belgian Cup finals
Cup Final
Belgian Cup final 2005